The International Society for Heart Research began as an "International Study Group for Research in Cardiac Metabolism" in Dubrovnik in 1968; at the 1976 World Congress in Tokyo, it adopted the name "International Society for Heart Research". It currently has over 3,000 members and comprises 7 international Sections (Australasian, Chinese, European, Indian, Japanese, Latin American and North American).  The president for the 2016 to 2019 term was Elizabeth Murphy, an NIH scientist.

The Society publishes its own journal (Journal of Molecular and Cellular Cardiology)  and newsletter (Heart News and Views).

The ISHR has developed a number of awards (Peter Harris Distinguished Scientist Award, Research Achievement Award, Outstanding Investigator Award, three named Distinguished Lecture Awards and Distinguished Leader Award for Faculty).  It also gives the Richard J. Bing Award for Young Investigators, an award named after its first President and founder.

References

Heart disease organizations
International medical associations